Jack Amos (c. 1828 - March 1906) was an American Indian and Confederate soldier. His American Indian name was Eahantatubbee ("He Who Goes Out And Kills"). During the American Civil War, Amos served as an interpreter in John W. Pierce's 1st Choctaw Battalion and in Samuel G. Spann's Independent Scouts. In his later years, Amos filed a federal suit which rendered a U.S. Supreme Court decision years after his death.

Background

Amos was born in the Choctaw Nation before the nation removed west of the Mississippi River. His birthplace is near present-day Marion, Mississippi. Amos' parents were Apatomby and Nahhatema. His family moved to the Indian village called Chunky Chitto when he was an infant.

Amos likely attended a missionary school where he gained some mastery of the English language. He was known to be an English to Indian language interpreter.

In Alfred J. Brown's History of Newton County from 1834 to 1894, Brown described Amos as being about 60 years old, having a wife, and in poor health.

American Civil War

Amos served in Pierce's 1st Choctaw Battalion and later Spann's Independent Scouts. He was one of the soldiers who helped with rescue efforts during the Chunky Creek Train Wreck. Confederate Veteran Magazine published an article about the wreck. In the article, Amos was described as a rescuer:

The cry reached the camp. "Fly to the rescue!" was the command, and in less time than I can tell the story every Indian was at the scene. It was there that Jack Amos again displayed his courage and devotion to the Confederate soldiers. I must not omit to say, however, that with a like valor and zeal Elder [Jackson], another full-blood Indian soldier, proved equal to the emergency. Jack Amos and Elder [Jackson] both reside now in Newton County.

Amos reported in his pension that he first enrolled in April 1861. By 1863, he was acting as an interpreter for Major John W. Pierce and for Major Samuel G. Spann. Amos was likely with the 1st Choctaw Battalion at the Battle of Ponchatoula. Amos surrendered at Meridian, Mississippi in 1865.

Final years

Amos lived the remainder of his life in Newton County, Mississippi. Amos did not own a home, so he boarded with several Newton County families during his lifetime. According to census and pension data, Amos resided with Thomas J. Reynolds and Evan S. Gilbert.

In 1901, Amos became a member of U.C.V. Camp Dabney H. Maury, No. 1312 which was based in Newton, Mississippi. He attended the 1903 reunion held at New Orleans. A Louisiana journalist wrote an article about him.

Jack Amos died in March 1906.

Amos' Legacy

The Treaty of Dancing Rabbit Creek was agreed to and signed by leaders of the Choctaws in September 1830. Article 14 allowed any member of the tribe to remain in Mississippi, become a citizen of the United States, and given 640 acres of land. Federal authorities failed to implement article 14 properly leaving tribal members landless. For decades after 1830, petitions were created to address article 14 concerns.

Dawes Commission
The Dawes Commission was designed to transfer tribe-controlled lands in Indian Territory and to privatize those lands for the benefit of tribal members. The Mississippi Choctaws were originally ignored in these transactions, but they soon were included in the proceedings. The Dawes Commission saw 25,000 applications for enrollment as Mississippi Choctaws. A little over 2,500 were identified as Mississippi Choctaws.

Appeals and lawsuits
Jack Amos led a class action lawsuit and petitioned for lands in Mississippi rather than lands in Indian Territory.

Amos and several Mississippi Choctaws filed a lawsuit called Jack Amos et al vs. The Choctaw Nation, U. S. Court of Central District of Indian Territory, No 158.

Supreme Court's Decision
WINTON v. AMOS, 255 U.S. 373, was argued in January 1919, and re-argued April 1920. A decision was reached on March 7, 1921. Justice Mahlon R. Pitney delivered the opinion of the court.

References

External links
 Jack Amos' Find A Grave Webpage
Newton County, Mississippi Historical and Genealogical Society: The Chunky Creek Train Wreck of 1863
Newton County, Mississippi Historical and Genealogical Society: Jack Amos Newton County Citizen
Winton v. Amos, 255 US 373 - Supreme Court 1921

Choctaw people
Native Americans in the American Civil War
1820s births
1906 deaths
Confederate States Army soldiers